The University of Pretoria Faculty of Law was established in 1908. It consists of six academic departments, six centres, two law clinics, and the Pretoria University Law Press (PULP). This faculty ranked best in Africa for the fourth year in a row with leading Departments of Jurisprudence; Mercantile Law; Private Law; Procedural Law; Public Law; and Centre for Human Rights. The faculty offers the undergraduate LLB degree, and postgraduate LLM/MPhil and LLD/PhD degrees. 

The Oliver R Tambo Law Library houses the faculty's collection of legal materials and the Law of Africa collection in the library is the single most comprehensive and current collection of primary legal materials of African countries.

The faculty organises the annual African and World Human Rights Moot Court Competition. In 2006, faculty's Centre for Human Rights received the UNESCO Prize for Human Rights Education. Since 1997, the university has produced more research output every year than any other institution of higher learning in South Africa, as measured by the Department of Education's accreditation benchmark.

History
The proposal for a university for the capital, first mooted in the Volksraad in 1889, was interrupted by the outbreak of the Anglo Boer War in 1899. In 1902, after the signing of the Peace of Vereeniging, the Normal College for teacher training was established in Groenkloof, Pretoria and in 1904 the Transvaal Technical Institute, with emphasis on mining education, opened in Johannesburg. In 1906, the Transvaal Technical Institute changed its name to the Transvaal University College. On 4 March 1908, when the Transvaal University College (TUC) transferred its arts and science courses to its newly established Pretoria Campus, the precursor to the university was established, initially offering courses in languages, sciences, and law.

In November 2019, Elsabe Schoeman became Dean of UP Law. Since August 2020, the Deputy Dean for Teaching and Learning is Professor Charles Maimela, the youngest and first black Deputy Dean at UP Law.

UP Law currently employs approximately 70 dedicated full-time academics.

Global ranking 
UP Law got a global 90th-placed ranking in 2020, 76th in 2019 and 92nd in 2018, making it the highest ranked Faculty of Law on the African continent.

The faculty has conferred 179 masters' and 35 doctoral graduates in 2017, followed by 173 master's and 27 doctoral graduates in 2018. In 2019, UP Law conferred 18 doctoral and 246 Master's degrees.

Centres, Units and Institutes

Centres, Units & Institutes in the faculty include the Centre for Advanced Corporate & Insolvency Law, Centre for Child Law, Centre for Human Rights, Centre for Intellectual Property Law, Centre for Medicine & Law, Institute for International and Comparative Law in Africa and Sports Law Centre in Africa. The Centres, Units & Institutes have a research and academic purpose.

Centre for Human Rights

The Centre for Human Rights at the University of Pretoria, South Africa, is an organisation dedicated to promoting human rights on the continent of Africa. The centre, founded in 1986, promotes human rights through educational outreach, including multinational conferences, seminars and publications such as Human Rights Law in Africa, The African Human Rights Law Journal, the African Human Rights Law Reports and The Constitutional Law of South Africa. The centre, which was founded during Apartheid, help adapt a Bill of Rights for South Africa and contributed to creating the South African Constitution. In 2006, the centre received the UNESCO Prize for Human Rights Education.

Institute for International and Comparative Law in Africa

The Institute for International and Comparative Law in Africa (ICLA), established at the beginning of 2011, is a research institute in the Faculty of Law with Professors Erika de Wet and Christof Heyns (the United Nations Special Rapporteur for extrajudicial, summary or arbitrary executions) being appointed as co-directors.

The ICLA co-ordinates the Oxford Constitutions Online African country reports and collaborates with the Centre for Human Rights to co-ordinate the Oxford Reports on International Law in Domestic Courts (ILDC) Online African case law.

Centre for Child Law

The Centre for Child was established in 1998 and is enjoyed recognition as a law clinic by the Law Society. Established in 2003, the centre's Children's Litigation Project acts as amicus curiae in litigation in relation to children's rights through, appearing in several cases before the North and South Gauteng High Court, Supreme Court of Appeal and Constitutional Court.

Moot Court Competitions

Pretoria University Law Press
The Pretoria University Law Press (PULP), within the Faculty of Law, publishes and distributes advanced scholarly legal texts in English, Afrikaans, French, Arabic and Portuguese. PULP publishes a series of collections of legal documents related to African public law and legal textbooks from other African countries and is a member of the Publishers' association of South Africa.

Student activities
Law students participate in the following activities:
 The Constitutional Tribunal is the judicial body of student governance and adjudicates disputes primarily between student organisations and its judges sit on the panel of student disciplinary hearings.
 The Pretoria Student Law Review (PSLR), published by PULP, is a student driven and administered initiative providing an interactive student platform for to discuss topical legal matters.
 Law House provides a platform for social engagement, community outreach and student engagement with the faculty.
 Several internal and external moot court competitions through the Moot and Debating Society.
 The Student Disciplinary Advisory Panel (SDAP) may give advice to students appearing in front of student disciplinary hearings regarding the procedure of student disciplinary hearings.

Alumni

Well-known alumni include:

Politicians 
 Pik Botha, Minister of Foreign Affairs and later Minister of Mineral and Energy Affairs
 Ronald Lamola, Minister of Justice and Correctional Services (since May 2019)
 Nelson Mandela, President of South Africa (1994 – 1999), honorary doctorate
Andries Nel, Deputy Minister of Justice and Correctional Services and now Deputy Minister for Cooperative Governance and Traditional Affairs
 J. G. Strijdom, Prime Minister of South Africa (1954 – 1958)

Justices/Judges 

 W. G. Boshoff, Former Transvaal Judge President
Frikkie Eloff, Former Transvaal Judge President
Brian Galgut, Retired Deputy Judge President, KwaZulu-Natal High Court
Louis Harms, Retired Deputy President of the Supreme Court of Appeal
Mabel Jansen, Former Judge of the Gauteng High Court
Johann Kriegler, Retired Justice of the Constitutional Court of South Africa (1994 – 2002)
Frans Lourens Herman Rumpff, Chief Justice of South Africa (1972 – 1982)
Dikgang Moseneke, Retired Deputy Chief Justice of South Africa (2005 – 2016), honorary doctorate
Piet Streicher, retired Judge of the Supreme Court of Appeal
Johann van der Westhuizen, Judge of the Constitutional Court of South Africa

Other 

 George Bizos, honorary doctorate (died 9 September 2020)
 Christof Heyns, Former Director (1999–2006) of the Centre for Human Rights (died 28 March 2021)
 Dire Tladi, Principal State Law Adviser for International Law for the South African Department of International Relations and Cooperation and South Africa Mission to the United Nations 
 Anna-Marie de Vos
 Wim Trengove
 Leonora van den Heever

See also

 South African National Schools Moot Court Competition
 African Human Rights Moot Court Competition
 World Human Rights Moot Court Competition
 African Human Rights Law Journal
 African Human Rights Law Reports

Notes

University of Pretoria
Legal education in South Africa